Franz Xaver Kappus (17 May 1883 – 9 October 1966) was an Austrian military officer, journalist, editor and writer who wrote poetry, short-stories, novels and screenplays.  Kappus is known chiefly as the military academy cadet who wrote to Austrian poet Rainer Maria Rilke (1875–1926) for advice in a series of letters from 1902 to 1908 that were assembled and published in the best-selling book Letters to a Young Poet (1929).

Life
Franz Xaver Kappus was born on 17 May 1883 in Timișoara (also known as German: Temeschwar, Temeschburg or Temeswar, in Hungarian: Temesvár), in the Banat province of the Austro-Hungarian Empire.  The Banat region (now divided between Hungary, Serbia and Romania) was populated with a large population of ethnic Germans known as Banat Swabians or Danube Swabians of which Kappus' ancestry is derived.  As a 19-year-old officer cadet at the Theresian Military Academy in Wiener Neustadt, Lower Austria, Kappus wrote to Rainer Maria Rilke after learning that as a young man, Rilke, the son of an Austrian army officer, had studied at the academy's lower school at Sankt Pölten in the 1890s. Kappus corresponded with Rilke, then a popular poet at the beginning of his career, in a series of letters from 1902 to 1908, in which he sought Rilke's advice regarding the quality of his poetry, and in deciding between a literary career or a career as an officer in the Austro-Hungarian Army.

Aside from his role in writing to Rilke and later publishing these letters, Kappus is largely forgotten by history.  Despite the hesitancy he expressed in his letters to Rilke about pursuing a military career, he continued his military studies and served for 15 years as an officer in the Austro-Hungarian Army. During the course of his life, he worked as a newspaper editor and journalist, writing poems, humorous sketches, short-stories, novels, and adapted several works (including his own) into screenplays for films in the 1930s.  However, Kappus did not achieve lasting fame.  After World War I, he was the editor of several newspapers, including Kappus Deutsche Wacht (trans. "Kappus' German Watch"), later known as Banater Tagblatt (trans. "Banat Daily"), and other newspapers Temeswarer Zeitung (trans. "Timișoara Newspaper"), and the Schwäbische Volkspresse (trans. "Swabian People's Press").

During World War II on 16 June 1945, he was part of a group in Berlin that founded the Liberal Democratic Party of Germany (initially intending to re-use the name "Deutsche Demokratische Partei" of a Weimar-era party), becoming one of its board members. The LDP later became one of the bloc parties under the East German communist regime, after whose fall it merged in 1990 with the West German Freie Demokratische Partei (trans. "Free Democratic Party"), which is affiliated with ideology of classical liberalism.

Kappus died on 9 October 1966 in East Berlin at the age of 83.

Works

Novels
 1918: Die lebenden Vierzehn (trans. "Fourteen Survivors") 
 1921: Die Peitsche im Antlitz (trans. "The whip in the Face")
 1922: Der Rote Reiter (trans. "The Red Rider")
 1929: Briefe an einen jungen Dichter (trans. "Letters to a Young Poet")
 1929: Martina und der Tänzer (trans. "Martina and the Dancers")
 1935: Brautfahrt um Lena (trans. "Lena, spoken for")
 1941: Flammende Schatten (trans. "Blazing Shadows") 
 1949: Flucht in die Liebe (trans. "Escape into Love")

Screenwriter
 1923: Der Rote Reiter (trans. The Red Rider), from his novel
 1926: The Woman in Gold
 1926: Les voleurs de gloire
 1935: Der Rote Reiter (trans. The Red Rider), from his novel, directed by Rolf Randolf
 1944: The man to whom they stole the name

See also
 German literature
 Lists of authors
 List of German-language authors
 List of German-language poets

References

Notes

Further reading
 Adel, Kurt. Franz Xaver Kappus (1883–1966): Österreicher Offizier under deutscher Schriftsteller (Peter Lang GmbH, 2006). 
 * Totok, William. From Expressionism to Entertainment, NewsPad, November 14, 2006.
 William Totok: Franz Xaver Kappus între isterie de război şi pacifism moderat (deutsch Franz Xaver Kappus zwischen Kriegshysterie und moderatem Pazifismus). In: Franz Xaver Kappus, Biciul disprețului. Povestea unui stigmatizat / Die Peitsche im Antlitz. Geschichte eines Gezeichneten. Prefaţă, tabel cronologic şi ediţie bilingvă îngrijită de William Totok. Traducere din limba germană de Werner Kremm, Editura Muzeul Literaturii Române, București 2018.

1883 births
1966 deaths
Austro-Hungarian Army officers
Austro-Hungarian culture
Danube-Swabian people
German male journalists
Writers from Timișoara
German male poets
20th-century German poets
German-language poets
20th-century German male writers
Austro-Hungarian emigrants to Germany
20th-century German journalists